There are two different companies referred to by the name of Varig, informally known as:
 "new Varig" - an airline formed in 2006 and since 2008 integrated into Gol Airlines, operating only to medium-haul international and all charter destinations;
 "old Varig" - the original airline by that name, which operated between 1927 and 2006.

Below are presented international destinations of "old" Varig only.

Africa

Angola
Luanda – Quatro de Fevereiro Airport (formerly Belas Airport)
Cape Verde
Sal – Amílcar Cabral International Airport
Ivory Coast
Abidjan – Port Bouet Airport
Liberia
Monrovia – Roberts International Airport
Mozambique
Maputo (formerly Lourenço Marques) – Maputo International Airport
Nigeria
Lagos – Murtala Muhammed International Airport
South Africa
Cape Town – Cape Town International Airport (formerly D. F. Malan Airport)
Johannesburg – OR Tambo International Airport (formerly Jan Smuts Airport)

Asia

Hong Kong (Hong Kong)
Hong Kong – Kai Tak Airport
Hong Kong – Hong Kong International Airport
Japan
Nagoya – Komaki Airport
Tokyo
Haneda Airport
Narita International Airport
Lebanon
Beirut – Beirut–Rafic Hariri International Airport
Thailand
Bangkok – Don Mueang International Airport

Europe

Denmark
Copenhagen – Kastrup Airport
France
Paris
Charles de Gaulle Airport
Orly Airport
Germany
Cologne – Cologne Bonn Airport
Frankfurt am Main – Frankfurt Airport
Munich – Munich Airport
Italy
Milan – Milan Malpensa Airport
Rome – Leonardo da Vinci-Fiumicino Airport
Netherlands
Amsterdam – Amsterdam Airport Schiphol
Portugal
Lisbon – Lisbon Airport
Porto – Francisco de Sá Carneiro Airport (formerly Pedras Rubras Airport)
Spain
Barcelona – Josep Tarradellas Barcelona–El Prat Airport
Madrid – Adolfo Suárez Madrid–Barajas Airport
Switzerland
Geneva – Geneva Airport
Zürich – Zürich Airport
United Kingdom
London – London Heathrow Airport

Central America and Caribbean
Aruba
Oranjestad – Queen Beatrix International Airport
Barbados
Bridgetown – Grantley Adams International Airport
Costa Rica
San José – Juan Santamaría International Airport
Dominican Republic
Santo Domingo (formerly Ciudad Trujillo) – Las Américas International Airport
Panamá
Panamá City – Tocumen International Airport
Puerto Rico
San Juan – Luis Muñoz Marín International Airport
Trinidad and Tobago
Port of Spain – Piarco International Airport

North America
Canada
Montreal – Montréal-Mirabel International Airport
Toronto – Toronto Pearson International Airport
Mexico
Cancún – Cancún International Airport
Mexico City – Mexico City International Airport
United States
Anchorage – Ted Stevens Anchorage International Airport
Atlanta – Hartsfield–Jackson Atlanta International Airport
Chicago – O'Hare International Airport
Honolulu – Daniel K. Inouye International Airport
Los Angeles – Los Angeles International Airport
Miami – Miami International Airport
New York – John F. Kennedy International Airport
Orlando – Orlando International Airport
San Francisco – San Francisco International Airport
Washington D.C. – Dulles International Airport

South America
Argentina
Buenos Aires – Ministro Pistarini International Airport (Ezeiza Airport)
Córdoba – Ingeniero Aeronáutico Ambrosio L.V. Taravella International Airport (formerly Pajas Blancas Airport) 
Mendoza – Governor Francisco Gabrielli International Airport (formerly El Plumerillo Airport)
Rosario – Rosario – Islas Malvinas International Airport
Bolivia
La Paz – El Alto International Airport
Santa Cruz de la Sierra – Viru Viru International Airport
Brazil
Aracaju – Santa Maria Airport
Araguaína – Araguaína Airport
Belém – Val de Cães/Julio Cézar Ribeiro International Airport
Belo Horizonte
Pampulha/Carlos Drummond de Andrade Airport
Tancredo Neves International Airport
Boa Vista – Atlas Brasil Cantanhede International Airport
Brasília – Pres. Juscelino Kubitschek International Airport
Campina Grande – Pres. João Suassuna Airport
Campinas – Viracopos International Airport
Campo Grande – Campo Grande International Airport
Carajás (Parauapebas) – Carajás Airport
Cruzeiro do Sul – Cruzeiro do Sul International Airport
Cuiabá/Várzea Grande – Mal. Rondon International Airport
Curitiba – Afonso Pena International Airport
Florianópolis – Hercílio Luz International Airport
Fortaleza – Pinto Martins International Airport
Foz do Iguaçu – Cataratas International Airport
Goiânia – Santa Genoveva Airport
Ilhéus – Jorge Amado Airport
Imperatriz – Pref. Renato Moreira Airport
João Pessoa – Pres. Castro Pinto International Airport
Joinville – Lauro Carneiro de Loyola Airport
Juazeiro do Norte – Orlando Bezerra de Menezes Airport
Londrina – Gov. José Richa Airport
Macapá – Alberto Alcolumbre International Airport
Maceió – Zumbi dos Palmares International Airport
Manaus
Eduardo Gomes International Airport
Ponta Pelada Airport
Marabá – Marabá Airport
Natal – Augusto Severo International Airport
Navegantes – Min. Victor Konder International Airport
Petrolina – Sen. Nilo Coelho Airport
Porto Alegre – Salgado Filho International Airport
Porto Velho – Gov. Jorge Teixeira de Oliveira International Airport
Recife – Guararapes/Gilberto Freyre International Airport
Rio Branco
Plácido de Castro International Airport
Presidente Médici International Airport
Rio de Janeiro
Galeão/Antonio Carlos Jobim International Airport
Santos Dumont Airport
Salvador da Bahia – Dep. Luís Eduardo Magalhães International Airport (formerly 2 de Julho Airport)
Santarém – Maestro Wilson Fonseca Airport
São Luís – Mal. Cunha Machado International Airport (formerly Tirirical Airport)
São Paulo
Congonhas Airport 
Guarulhos/Gov. André Franco Montoro International Airport
Tabatinga – Tabatinga International Airport 
Tefé – Tefé Airport 
Teresina – Sen. Petrônio Portella Airport
Uberaba – Mário de Almeida Franco Airport
Uberlândia – Ten. Cel. Av. César Bombonato Airport
Vitória – Eurico de Aguiar Salles Airport (formerly Goiabeiras Airport)
Chile
Santiago de Chile – Arturo Merino Benítez International Airport (formerly Pudahuel Airport)
Colombia
Bogotá – El Dorado International Airport
Ecuador
Guayaquil – José Joaquín de Olmedo International Airport (formerly Simón Bolívar International Airport)
Quito – Mariscal Sucre International Airport (Old Mariscal Sucre International Airport)
French Guiana
Cayenne – Rochambeau Airport
Guyana
Georgetown – Cheddi Jagan International Airport (formerly Timehri Airport)
Paraguay
Asunción – Silvio Pettirossi International Airport (formerly Pres. Gal. Stroessner International Airport)
Peru
Iquitos – Crnl. FAP Francisco Secada Vignetta International Airport
Lima – Jorge Chávez International Airport
Suriname
Paramaribo – Johan Adolf Pengel International Airport (formerly Zanderij Airport)
Uruguay
Montevideo – Carrasco/Gal. Cesário L. Berisso International Airport
Venezuela
Caracas – Simón Bolívar International Airport (formerly Maiquetia Airport)

References

Lists of airline destinations
List of